Abetz is a German surname. Notable people with this name include:

Eric Abetz (born 1958), Australian politician
Otto Abetz (1903–1958), German ambassador to Vichy France during World War II
Peter Abetz (born 1952), Australian politician

German-language surnames